United Express Flight 2415 was a regularly scheduled flight in the northwest United States from Seattle to Pasco, Washington, operated using a BAe Jetstream 31. Late on Tuesday, December 26, 1989, Flight 2415 crashed while attempting to land at Pasco's Tri-Cities Airport, killing both pilots and all four passengers aboard.

Aircraft, crew, and flight information
North Pacific Airlines, operating as United Express, operated Flight 2415 as a regularly scheduled flight from Seattle to Pasco, with an intermediate stop in Yakima.  

On the night of the accident, Flight 2415 was operated using a BAe Jetstream 31 twin-turboprop airliner, registration number N410UE. The aircraft was manufactured two years earlier in October 1987, and had accumulated approximately 4,972 flight hours at the time of the accident.  The aircraft was not equipped with a ground proximity warning system and did not have a cockpit voice recorder or flight data recorder.

The captain was 38-year-old Barry W. Roberts. He had 6,600 flight hours, including 670 hours on the Jetstream. The first officer was 25-year-old Douglas K. McInroe, who had 2,792 flight hours with 213 of them on the Jetstream.

Accident
Flight 2415 departed Seattle at 20:45 PST, and arrived at Yakima with no reported mechanical difficulties. A company station agent at Yakima witnessed First Officer McInroe knocking ice off the wings of the aircraft, with the assistance of another company first officer. The station agent asked Captain Roberts whether he wanted his aircraft deiced, but the captain declined.  The station agent also asked if the captain wanted Flight 2415's tail deiced, since the first officers deicing the wings would be unable to reach the tail surfaces.  Roberts declined this as well. Flight 2415 was the only flight to depart Yakima that afternoon/evening that was not deiced prior to departure.

At 21:59, air traffic controllers at the Yakima tower announced that Yakima airport was closed due to weather conditions. However, at 22:00, Flight 2415 contacted Yakima ground controllers and were cleared to proceed to Yakima's runway 27 for departure.

At 22:26, Flight 2415 was cleared for an Instrument Landing System (ILS) approach to runway 21R at Pasco's Tri-Cities Airport. Conversations between Flight 2415 and controllers were normal in the minutes leading up to the crash, and no distress call was made.

At 22:30, while Flight 2415 was on final approach, the Pasco tower controller observed Flight 2415 flying "higher than normal" for a final approach, and also descending faster than normal. The controller watched Flight 2415 descend until it struck the ground  short of runway 21R. The controller alerted emergency response crews, who arrived at the crash site at 22:34; the aircraft was destroyed, and there were no survivors.

Investigation
The accident was investigated by the National Transportation Safety Board. Investigators determined that the airplane was flying well above the glideslope for an ILS approach. From the plane's last recorded position, investigators determined that Flight 2415 would need to follow a 7-degree glidepath in order to descend rapidly enough to reach the runway threshold. Investigators also determined that ice had likely built up on the plane's wings during the flight, creating a higher risk of a stall at low speeds. The combination of an excessively steep descent, low speed, and aircraft icing likely resulted in loss of control of the aircraft.

On November 4, 1991, the NTSB issued its final report on the crash, which contained the following conclusions:

References

Aviation accidents and incidents in the United States in 1989
Accidents and incidents involving the British Aerospace Jetstream
Airliner accidents and incidents caused by pilot error
Aviation accidents and incidents caused by air traffic controller error
Airliner accidents and incidents caused by ice
Airliner accidents and incidents in Washington (state)
Transportation in Franklin County, Washington
North Pacific Airlines accidents and incidents
2415
1989 in Washington (state)
December 1989 events in the United States